The 85th United States Congress was a meeting of the legislative branch of the United States federal government, composed of the United States Senate and the United States House of Representatives. It met in Washington, D.C. from January 3, 1957, to January 3, 1959, during the fifth and sixth years of Dwight Eisenhower's presidency. The apportionment of seats in the House of Representatives was based on the 1950 United States census.

Both chambers had a Democratic majority.

To date, this is the earliest Congress with a member still living.

Major events

 January 5, 1957: President Eisenhower announced the Eisenhower Doctrine in a special message to Congress
 January 20, 1957: Inauguration of President Dwight D. Eisenhower for a second term
 August 21, 1957: President Eisenhower announced a 2-year suspension of nuclear testing
 August 28, 1957: Senator Strom Thurmond set a record for the longest filibuster with his 24-hour, 18-minute speech against the Civil Rights Act of 1957
September 24, 1957: Little Rock Crisis: President Eisenhower sent federal troops to Arkansas to provide safe passage into Central High School for the Little Rock Nine.
 October 4, 1957: The Soviet Union launched Sputnik 1, the first artificial satellite to orbit the earth
 October 21, 1957: The U.S. military sustained its first combat fatality in Vietnam
 November 7, 1957: Gaither Report called for more American missiles and fallout shelters
 November 25, 1957: President Eisenhower suffers from a stroke
 January 31, 1958: U.S. launched its first satellite, Explorer 1
 July 15, 1958: U.S intervenes in the Lebanon Crisis, the first major application of the Eisenhower Doctorine.
 October 1, 1958: NASA started operations

Major legislation

 August 14, 1957: Airways Modernization Act, 
 September 2, 1957: Price-Anderson Nuclear Industries Indemnity Act, 
 September 9, 1957: Civil Rights Act of 1957, 
 July 29, 1958: National Aeronautics and Space Act, 
 1958: Transportation Act of 1958, 
 August 23, 1958: Federal Aviation Act of 1958, 
 August 28, 1958: EURATOM Cooperation Act of 1958, 
 August 28, 1958: Military Construction Appropriation Act (Advanced Research Projects Agency), 
 September 2, 1958: National Defense Education Act, 
 1958: Department of Defense Reorganization Act, 
 1958: Pasatore-Walter Immigration Act

States admitted 
 January 3, 1959: Alaska was admitted as the 49th state.

Party summary

Senate

House of Representatives

Leadership

Senate 
 President: Richard Nixon (R)
 President pro tempore: Carl Hayden (D)

Majority (Democratic) leadership 
Majority Leader and Conference Chairman: Lyndon B. Johnson
 Majority Whip: Mike Mansfield
 Democratic Caucus Secretary: Thomas C. Hennings Jr.

Minority (Republican) leadership 
 Minority Leader: William Knowland
 Minority Whip: Everett Dirksen
 Republican Conference Chairman: Leverett Saltonstall
 Republican Conference Secretary: Milton Young
 National Senatorial Committee Chair: Everett Dirksen
 Policy Committee Chairman: Styles Bridges

House of Representatives 
 Speaker: Sam Rayburn (D)

Majority (Democratic) leadership 
 Majority Leader: John W. McCormack
 Majority Whip: Carl Albert
 Democratic Caucus Chairman: Melvin Price
 Democratic Campaign Committee Chairman: Michael J. Kirwan

Minority (Republican) leadership 
 Minority Leader: Joseph W. Martin Jr.
 Minority Whip: Leslie C. Arends
 Republican Conference Chairman: Charles B. Hoeven
 Policy Committee Chairman: Joseph W. Martin Jr.
 Republican Campaign Committee Chairman: Richard M. Simpson

Caucuses
 House Democratic Caucus
 Senate Democratic Caucus

Members

Senate 
Senators are popularly elected statewide every two years, with one-third beginning new six-year terms with each Congress. Preceding the names in the list below are Senate class numbers, which indicate the cycle of their election. Senators in each state are listed by class. In this Congress, Class 1 meant their term ended with this Congress, facing re-election in 1958; Class 2 meant their term began in the last Congress, facing re-election in 1960; and Class 3 meant their term began in this Congress, facing re-election in 1962.

Alabama
 3. J. Lister Hill (D)
 2. John Sparkman (D)

Arizona
 3. Carl Hayden (D)
 1. Barry Goldwater (R)

Arkansas
 2. John L. McClellan (D)
 3. J. William Fulbright (D)

California
 1. William Knowland (R), until January 2, 1959
 3. Thomas Kuchel (R)

Colorado
 2. Gordon Allott (R)
 3. John A. Carroll (D)

Connecticut
 1. William A. Purtell (R)
 3. Prescott Bush (R)

Delaware
 1. John J. Williams (R)
 2. J. Allen Frear Jr. (D)

Florida
 1. Spessard Holland (D)
 3. George Smathers (D)

Georgia
 2. Richard Russell Jr. (D)
 3. Herman Talmadge (D)

Idaho
 2. Henry Dworshak (R)
 3. Frank Church (D)

Illinois
 2. Paul Douglas (D)
 3. Everett Dirksen (R)

Indiana
 1. William E. Jenner (R)
 3. Homer E. Capehart (R)

Iowa
 2. Thomas E. Martin (R)
 3. Bourke B. Hickenlooper (R)

Kansas
 2. Andrew Frank Schoeppel (R)
 3. Frank Carlson (R)

Kentucky
 2. John Sherman Cooper (R)
 3. Thruston Ballard Morton (R)

Louisiana
 2. Allen J. Ellender (D)
 3. Russell B. Long (D)

Maine
 1. Frederick G. Payne (R)
 2. Margaret Chase Smith (R)

Maryland
 1. James Glenn Beall (R)
 3. John Marshall Butler (R)

Massachusetts
 1. John F. Kennedy (D)
 2. Leverett Saltonstall (R)

Michigan
 1. Charles E. Potter (R)
 2. Patrick V. McNamara (D)

Minnesota
 1. Edward John Thye (R)
 2. Hubert Humphrey (DFL)

Mississippi
 1. John C. Stennis (D)
 2. James Eastland (D)

Missouri
 1. Stuart Symington (D)
 3. Thomas C. Hennings Jr. (D)

Montana
 1. Mike Mansfield (D)
 2. James E. Murray (D)

Nebraska
 1. Roman Hruska (R)
 2. Carl Curtis (R)

Nevada
 1. George W. Malone (R)
 3. Alan Bible (D)

New Hampshire
 2. Styles Bridges (R)
 3. Norris Cotton (R)

New Jersey
 1. Howard Alexander Smith (R)
 2. Clifford P. Case (R)

New Mexico
 1. Dennis Chávez (D)
 2. Clinton Anderson (D)

New York
 1. Irving Ives (R)
 3. Jacob Javits (R), from January 9, 1957

North Carolina
 2. W. Kerr Scott (D), until April 16, 1958
 B. Everett Jordan (D), from April 19, 1958
 3. Sam Ervin (D)

North Dakota
 1. William Langer (R-NPL)
 3. Milton Young (R)

Ohio
 1. John W. Bricker (R)
 3. Frank Lausche (D)

Oklahoma
 2. Robert S. Kerr (D)
 3. Mike Monroney (D)

Oregon
 2. Richard L. Neuberger (D)
 3. Wayne Morse (D)

Pennsylvania
 1. Edward Martin (R)
 3. Joseph S. Clark Jr. (D)

Rhode Island
 1. John Pastore (D)
 2. Theodore F. Green (D)

South Carolina
 2. Strom Thurmond (D)
 3. Olin D. Johnston (D)

South Dakota
 2. Karl E. Mundt (R)
 3. Francis H. Case (R)

Tennessee
 1. Albert Gore Sr. (D)
 2. Estes Kefauver (D)

Texas
 1. Price Daniel (D), until January 14, 1957
 William A. Blakley (D), January 15, 1957 – April 28, 1957
 Ralph Yarborough (D), from April 29, 1957
 2. Lyndon B. Johnson (D)

Utah
 1. Arthur Vivian Watkins (R)
 3. Wallace F. Bennett (R)

Vermont
 1. Ralph Flanders (R)
 3. George Aiken (R)

Virginia
 1. Harry F. Byrd (D)
 2. Absalom Willis Robertson (D)

Washington
 1. Henry M. Jackson (D)
 3. Warren Magnuson (D)

West Virginia
 1. Chapman Revercomb (R)
 2. Matthew M. Neely (D), until January 18, 1958
 John D. Hoblitzell Jr. (R), January 25, 1958 – November 4, 1958
 Jennings Randolph (D), from November 4, 1958

Wisconsin
 1. Joseph McCarthy (R), until May 2, 1957
 William Proxmire (D), from August 28, 1957
 3. Alexander Wiley (R)

Wyoming
 1. Frank A. Barrett (R)
 2. Joseph C. O'Mahoney (D)

House of Representatives

Alabama
 . Frank W. Boykin (D)
 . George M. Grant (D)
 . George W. Andrews (D)
 . Kenneth A. Roberts (D)
 . Albert Rains (D)
 . Armistead I. Selden Jr. (D)
 . Carl Elliott (D)
 . Robert E. Jones Jr. (D)
 . George Huddleston Jr. (D)

Arizona
 . John Jacob Rhodes (R)
 . Stewart Udall (D)

Arkansas
 . Ezekiel C. Gathings (D)
 . Wilbur Mills (D)
 . James William Trimble (D)
 . Oren Harris (D)
 . Brooks Hays (D)
 . William F. Norrell (D)

California
 . Hubert B. Scudder (R)
 . Clair Engle (D)
 . John E. Moss (D)
 . William S. Mailliard (R)
 . John F. Shelley (D)
 . John F. Baldwin Jr. (R)
 . John J. Allen Jr. (R)
 . George P. Miller (D)
 . J. Arthur Younger (R)
 . Charles Gubser (R)
 . John J. McFall (D)
 . B. F. Sisk (D)
 . Charles M. Teague (R)
 . Harlan Hagen (D)
 . Gordon L. McDonough (R)
 . Donald L. Jackson (R)
 . Cecil R. King (D)
 . Craig Hosmer (R)
 . Chester E. Holifield (D)
 . H. Allen Smith (R)
 . Edgar W. Hiestand (R)
 . Joseph F. Holt (R)
 . Clyde Doyle (D)
 . Glenard P. Lipscomb (R)
 . Patrick J. Hillings (R)
 . James Roosevelt (D)
 . Harry R. Sheppard (D)
 . James B. Utt (R)
 . Dalip Singh Saund (D)
 . Bob Wilson (R)

Colorado
 . Byron G. Rogers (D)
 . William S. Hill (R)
 . John Chenoweth (R)
 . Wayne N. Aspinall (D)

Connecticut
 . Antoni Sadlak (R)
 . Edwin H. May Jr. (R)
 . Horace Seely-Brown Jr. (R)
 . Albert W. Cretella (R)
 . Albert P. Morano (R)
 . James T. Patterson (R)

Delaware
 . Harry G. Haskell Jr. (R)

Florida
 . William C. Cramer (R)
 . Charles E. Bennett (D)
 . Bob Sikes (D)
 . Dante Fascell (D)
 . Syd Herlong (D)
 . Paul Rogers (D)
 . James A. Haley (D)
 . Donald Ray Matthews (D)

Georgia
 . Prince Hulon Preston Jr. (D)
 . J. L. Pilcher (D)
 . Tic Forrester (D)
 . John Flynt (D)
 . James C. Davis (D)
 . Carl Vinson (D)
 . Henderson Lovelace Lanham (D), until November 10, 1957
 : Harlan Erwin Mitchell (D), from January 8, 1958
 . Iris Faircloth Blitch (D)
 . Phillip M. Landrum (D)
 . Paul Brown (D)

Idaho
 . Gracie Pfost (D)
 . Hamer H. Budge (R)

Illinois
 . William L. Dawson (D)
 . Barratt O'Hara (D)
 . Emmet Byrne (R)
 . William E. McVey (R), until August 10, 1958
 . John C. Kluczynski (D)
 . Thomas J. O'Brien (D)
 . James Bowler (D), until July 18, 1957
 Roland V. Libonati (D), from December 31, 1957
 . Thomas S. Gordon (D)
 . Sidney R. Yates (D)
 . Harold R. Collier (R)
 . Timothy P. Sheehan (R)
 . Charles A. Boyle (D)
 . Marguerite S. Church (R)
 . Russell W. Keeney (R), until January 11, 1958
 . Noah M. Mason (R)
 . Leo E. Allen (R)
 . Leslie C. Arends (R)
 . Robert H. Michel (R)
 . Robert B. Chiperfield (R)
 . Sid Simpson (R), until October 26, 1958
 . Peter F. Mack Jr. (D)
 . William L. Springer (R)
 . Charles W. Vursell (R)
 . Melvin Price (D)
 . Kenneth J. Gray (D)

Indiana
 . Ray Madden (D)
 . Charles A. Halleck (R)
 . F. Jay Nimtz (R)
 . E. Ross Adair (R)
 . John V. Beamer (R)
 . Cecil M. Harden (R)
 . William G. Bray (R)
 . Winfield K. Denton (D)
 . Earl Wilson (R)
 . Ralph Harvey (R)
 . Charles B. Brownson (R)

Iowa
 . Fred Schwengel (R)
 . Henry O. Talle (R)
 . H. R. Gross (R)
 . Karl M. LeCompte (R)
 . Paul Cunningham (R)
 . Merwin Coad (D)
 . Ben F. Jensen (R)
 . Charles B. Hoeven (R)

Kansas
 . William H. Avery (R)
 . Errett P. Scrivner (R)
 . Myron V. George (R)
 . Edward Herbert Rees (R)
 . James Floyd Breeding (D)
 . Wint Smith (R)

Kentucky
 . Noble Jones Gregory (D)
 . William Natcher (D)
 . John M. Robsion Jr. (R)
 . Frank Chelf (D)
 . Brent Spence (D)
 . John C. Watts (D)
 . Carl D. Perkins (D)
 . Eugene Siler (R)

Louisiana
 . F. Edward Hébert (D)
 . Hale Boggs (D)
 . Edwin E. Willis (D)
 . Overton Brooks (D)
 . Otto Passman (D)
 . James H. Morrison (D)
 . T. Ashton Thompson (D)
 . George S. Long (D), until March 22, 1958

Maine
 . Robert Hale (R)
 . Frank M. Coffin (D)
 . Clifford McIntire (R)

Maryland
 . Edward Tylor Miller (R)
 . James Devereux (R)
 . Edward Garmatz (D)
 . George Hyde Fallon (D)
 . Richard Lankford (D)
 . DeWitt Hyde (R)
 . Samuel Friedel (D)

Massachusetts
 . John W. Heselton (R)
 . Edward Boland (D)
 . Philip J. Philbin (D)
 . Harold Donohue (D)
 . Edith Nourse Rogers (R)
 . William H. Bates (R)
 . Thomas J. Lane (D)
 . Torbert Macdonald (D)
 . Donald W. Nicholson (R)
 . Laurence Curtis (R)
 . Tip O'Neill (D)
 . John W. McCormack (D)
 . Richard B. Wigglesworth (R), until November 13, 1958
 . Joseph W. Martin Jr. (R)

Michigan
 . Thaddeus M. Machrowicz (D)
 . George Meader (R)
 . August E. Johansen (R)
 . Clare Hoffman (R)
 . Gerald Ford (R)
 . Charles E. Chamberlain (R)
 . Robert J. McIntosh (R)
 . Alvin Morell Bentley (R)
 . Robert P. Griffin (R)
 . Elford Albin Cederberg (R)
 . Victor A. Knox (R)
 . John B. Bennett (R)
 . Charles Diggs (D)
 . Louis C. Rabaut (D)
 . John Dingell (D)
 . John Lesinski Jr. (D)
 . Martha Griffiths (D)
 . William Broomfield (R)

Minnesota
 . August H. Andresen (R), until January 14, 1958
 Al Quie (R), from February 18, 1958
 .Joseph P. O'Hara (R)
 .Roy Wier (DFL)
 .Eugene McCarthy (DFL)
 .Walter Judd (R)
 .Fred Marshall (DFL)
 .Herman Carl Andersen (R)
 .John Blatnik (DFL)
 .Coya Knutson (DFL)

Mississippi
 . Thomas Abernethy (D)
 . Jamie Whitten (D)
 . Frank Ellis Smith (D)
 . John Bell Williams (D)
 . W. Arthur Winstead (D)
 . William M. Colmer (D)

Missouri
 . Frank M. Karsten (D)
 . Thomas B. Curtis (R)
 . Leonor Sullivan (D)
 . George H. Christopher (D)
 . Richard Walker Bolling (D)
 . William Raleigh Hull Jr. (D)
 . Charles Harrison Brown (D)
 . A. S. J. Carnahan (D)
 . Clarence Cannon (D)
 . Paul C. Jones (D)
 . Morgan M. Moulder (D)

Montana
 . Lee Metcalf (D)
 . LeRoy H. Anderson (D)

Nebraska
 . Phillip Hart Weaver (R)
 . Glenn Cunningham (R)
 . Robert Dinsmore Harrison (R)
 . Arthur L. Miller (R)

Nevada
 . Walter S. Baring Jr. (D)

New Hampshire
 . Chester Earl Merrow (R)
 . Perkins Bass (R)

New Jersey
 . Charles A. Wolverton (R)
 . Milton W. Glenn (R), from November 5, 1957
 . James C. Auchincloss (R)
 . Frank Thompson (D)
 . Peter Frelinghuysen Jr. (R)
 . Florence P. Dwyer (R)
 . William B. Widnall (R)
 . Gordon Canfield (R)
 . Frank C. Osmers Jr. (R)
 . Peter W. Rodino (D)
 . Hugh Joseph Addonizio (D)
 . Robert Kean (R)
 . Alfred Dennis Sieminski (D)
 . Vincent J. Dellay (R) to (D), sometime in 1958

New Mexico
 . John J. Dempsey (D), until March 11, 1958
 . Joseph Montoya (D), from April 9, 1957

New York
 . Stuyvesant Wainwright (R)
 . Steven Derounian (R)
 . Frank J. Becker (R)
 . Henry J. Latham (R), until December 31, 1958
 . Albert H. Bosch (R)
 . Lester Holtzman (D)
 . James J. Delaney (D)
 . Victor Anfuso (D)
 . Eugene James Keogh (D)
 . Edna F. Kelly (D)
 . Emanuel Celler (D)
 . Francis E. Dorn (R)
 . Abraham J. Multer (D)
 . John J. Rooney (D)
 . John H. Ray (R)
 . Adam Clayton Powell Jr. (D)
 . Frederic René Coudert Jr. (R)
 . Alfred E. Santangelo (D)
 . Leonard Farbstein (D)
 . Ludwig Teller (D)
 . Herbert Zelenko (D)
 . James C. Healey (D)
 . Isidore Dollinger (D)
 . Charles A. Buckley (D)
 . Paul A. Fino (R)
 . Edwin B. Dooley (R)
 . Ralph W. Gwinn (R)
 . Katharine St. George (R)
 . J. Ernest Wharton (R)
 . Leo W. O'Brien (D)
 . Dean P. Taylor (R)
 . Bernard W. Kearney (R)
 . Clarence E. Kilburn (R)
 . William R. Williams (R)
 . R. Walter Riehlman (R)
 . John Taber (R)
 . W. Sterling Cole (R), until December 1, 1957
 Howard W. Robison (R), from January 14, 1958
 . Kenneth Keating (R)
 . Harold C. Ostertag (R)
 . William E. Miller (R)
 . Edmund P. Radwan (R)
 . John R. Pillion (R)
 . Daniel A. Reed (R)

North Carolina
 . Herbert Covington Bonner (D)
 . Lawrence H. Fountain (D)
 . Graham Arthur Barden (D)
 . Harold D. Cooley (D)
 . Ralph James Scott (D)
 . Carl T. Durham (D)
 . Alton Lennon (D)
 . Alvin Paul Kitchin (D)
 . Hugh Quincy Alexander (D)
 . Charles R. Jonas (R)
 . Basil Lee Whitener (D)
 . George A. Shuford (D)

North Dakota
 . Otto Krueger (R)
 . Usher L. Burdick (R-NPL)

Ohio
 . Gordon H. Scherer (R)
 . William E. Hess (R)
 . Paul F. Schenck (R)
 . William Moore McCulloch (R)
 . Cliff Clevenger (R)
 . James G. Polk (D)
 . Clarence J. Brown (R)
 . Jackson Edward Betts (R)
 . Thomas L. Ashley (D)
 . Thomas A. Jenkins (R)
 . David S. Dennison (R)
 . John M. Vorys (R)
 . Albert David Baumhart Jr. (R)
 . William Hanes Ayres (R)
 . John E. Henderson (R)
 . Frank T. Bow (R)
 . J. Harry McGregor (R), until October 7, 1958; vacant thereafter
 . Wayne Hays (D)
 . Michael J. Kirwan (D)
 . Michael A. Feighan (D)
 . Charles Vanik (D)
 . Frances P. Bolton (R)
 . William E. Minshall Jr. (R)

Oklahoma
 . Page Belcher (R)
 . Ed Edmondson (D)
 . Carl Albert (D)
 . Tom Steed (D)
 . John Jarman (D)
 . Toby Morris (D)

Oregon
 . A. Walter Norblad (R)
 . Al Ullman (D)
 . Edith Green (D)
 . Charles O. Porter (D)

Pennsylvania
 . William A. Barrett (D)
 . Kathryn E. Granahan (D)
 . James A. Byrne (D)
 . Earl Chudoff (D), until January 5, 1958
 Robert N. C. Nix Sr. (D), from May 20, 1958
 . William J. Green Jr. (D)
 . Hugh Scott (R)
 . Benjamin F. James (R)
 . Willard S. Curtin (R)
 . Paul B. Dague (R)
 . Joseph L. Carrigg (R)
 . Dan Flood (D)
 . Ivor D. Fenton (R)
 . Samuel K. McConnell Jr. (R), until September 1, 1957
 John A. Lafore Jr. (R), from November 5, 1957
 . George M. Rhodes (D)
 . Francis E. Walter (D)
 . Walter M. Mumma (R)
 . Alvin Bush (R)
 . Richard M. Simpson (R)
 . S. Walter Stauffer (R)
 . James E. Van Zandt (R)
 . Augustine B. Kelley (D), until November 20, 1957
 John Herman Dent (D), from January 21, 1958
 . John P. Saylor (R)
 . Leon H. Gavin (R)
 . Carroll D. Kearns (R)
 . Frank M. Clark (D)
 . Thomas E. Morgan (D)
 . James G. Fulton (R)
 . Herman P. Eberharter (D), until September 9, 1958
 . Robert J. Corbett (R)
 . Elmer J. Holland (D)

Rhode Island
 . Aime Forand (D)
 . John E. Fogarty (D)

South Carolina
 . L. Mendel Rivers (D)
 . John J. Riley (D)
 . William Jennings Bryan Dorn (D)
 . Robert T. Ashmore (D)
 . Robert W. Hemphill (D)
 . John L. McMillan (D)

South Dakota
 . George McGovern (D)
 . Ellis Yarnal Berry (R)

Tennessee
 . B. Carroll Reece (R)
 . Howard Baker Sr. (R)
 . James B. Frazier Jr. (D)
 . Joe L. Evins (D)
 . J. Carlton Loser (D)
 . Ross Bass (D)
 . Tom J. Murray (D)
 . Jere Cooper (D), until December 18, 1957
 Fats Everett (D), from February 1, 1958
 . Clifford Davis (D)

Texas
 . Martin Dies Jr. (D)
 . Wright Patman (D)
 . Jack Brooks (D)
 . Lindley Beckworth (D)
 . Sam Rayburn (D)
 . Bruce Alger (R)
 . Olin E. Teague (D)
 . John Dowdy (D)
 . Albert Thomas (D)
 . Clark W. Thompson (D)
 . Homer Thornberry (D)
 . William R. Poage (D)
 . Jim Wright (D)
 . Frank N. Ikard (D)
 . John Andrew Young (D)
 . Joe M. Kilgore (D)
 . J. T. Rutherford (D)
 . Omar Burleson (D)
 . Walter E. Rogers (D)
 . George H. Mahon (D)
 . Paul J. Kilday (D)
 . O. C. Fisher (D)

Utah
 . Henry Aldous Dixon (R)
 . William A. Dawson (R)

Vermont
 . Winston L. Prouty (R)

Virginia
 . Edward J. Robeson Jr. (D)
 . Porter Hardy Jr. (D)
 . J. Vaughan Gary (D)
 . Watkins Moorman Abbitt (D)
 . William M. Tuck (D)
 . Richard Harding Poff (R)
 . Burr Harrison (D)
 . Howard W. Smith (D)
 . W. Pat Jennings (D)
 . Joel Broyhill (R)

Washington
 . Donald H. Magnuson (D)
 . Thomas Pelly (R)
 . Jack Westland (R)
 . Russell V. Mack (R)
 . Hal Holmes (R)
 . Walt Horan (R)
 . Thor C. Tollefson (R)

West Virginia
 . Arch A. Moore Jr. (R)
 . Harley Orrin Staggers (D)
 . Cleveland M. Bailey (D)
 . Will E. Neal (R)
 . Elizabeth Kee (D)
 . Robert Byrd (D)

Wisconsin
 . Lawrence H. Smith (R), until January 22, 1958
 . Donald Edgar Tewes (R)
 . Gardner R. Withrow (R)
 . Clement J. Zablocki (D)
 . Henry S. Reuss (D)
 . William Van Pelt (R)
 . Melvin Laird (R)
 . John W. Byrnes (R)
 . Lester Johnson (D)
 . Alvin O'Konski (R)

Wyoming
 . Edwin Keith Thomson (R)

Non-voting members
 . Bob Bartlett (D)
 . John A. Burns (D)
 . Antonio Fernós-Isern (PPD)

Changes in membership

Senate

|-
| New York(3)
| Vacant
| Retired.Successor elected in 1956, but took seat late to prevent Governor from appointing a rival to be his successor as N.Y. Attorney General	
| nowrap  | Jacob Javits (R)
| January 9, 1957

|-
| Texas(1)
| nowrap  | Price Daniel (D)
| Resigned January 14, 1957, after being elected Governor of Texas.Successor appointed January 15, 1957.
| nowrap  | William A. Blakley (D)
| January 15, 1957

|-
| Texas(1)
| nowrap  | William A. Blakley (D)
| Interim appointee retired when successor elected.Successor elected April 28, 1957.
| nowrap  | Ralph Yarborough (D)
| April 29, 1957

|-
| Wisconsin(1)
| nowrap  | Joseph McCarthy (R)
| Died May 2, 1957.Successor elected August 27, 1957.
| nowrap  | William Proxmire (D)
| August 28, 1957

|-
| West Virginia(2)
| nowrap  | Matthew M. Neely (D)
| Died January 18, 1958.Successor appointed January 25, 1958.
| nowrap  | John D. Hoblitzell Jr. (R)
| January 25, 1958

|-
| North Carolina(2)
| nowrap  | W. Kerr Scott (D)
| Died April 16, 1958.Successor appointed April 19, 1958, and then elected November 4, 1958.
| nowrap  | B. Everett Jordan (D)
| April 19, 1958

|-
| West Virginia(2)
| nowrap  | John D. Hoblitzell Jr. (R)
| Interim appointee lost special election.Successor elected November 4, 1958.
| nowrap  | Jennings Randolph (D)
| November 5, 1958

|-
| California(1)
| nowrap  | William F. Knowland (R)
| Resigned early January 2, 1959.
| Vacant
| Not filled this term

|}

House of Representatives

|-
| 
| Vacant
| Rep. Antonio M. Fernández died during previous congress.
|   | Joseph Montoya (D)
| April 9, 1957

|-
| 
| Vacant
| Rep. T. Millet Hand died during previous congress.
|   | Milton W. Glenn (R)
| November 5, 1957

|-
| 
|  | James Bowler (D)
| Died July 18, 1957.
|   | Roland V. Libonati (D)
| December 31, 1957

|-
| 
|  | Samuel K. McConnell Jr. (R)
| Resigned September 1, 1957, after becoming Executive Director of the United Cerebral Palsy Associations
|   | John A. Lafore Jr. (R)
| November 5, 1957

|-
| 
|  | Henderson L. Lanham (D)
| Died November 10, 1957.
|   | Harlan E. Mitchell (D)
| January 8, 1958

|-
| 
|  | Augustine B. Kelley (D)
| Died November 20, 1957.
|   | John H. Dent (D)
| January 21, 1958

|-
| 
|  | W. Sterling Cole (R)
| Resigned December 1, 1957, after becoming Director General of the International Atomic Energy Agency.
|   | Howard W. Robison (R)
| January 14, 1958

|-
| 
|  | Jere Cooper (D)
| Died December 18, 1957.
|   | Fats Everett (D)
| February 1, 1958

|-
| 
|  | Earl Chudoff (D)
| Resigned January 5, 1958, after being elected judge of the Philadelphia Court of Common Pleas No. 1.
|   | Robert N.C. Nix Sr. (D)
| May 20, 1958

|-
| 
|  | Vincent J. Dellay (R)
| Changed political affiliation some time in 1958.
|   | Vincent J. Dellay (D)
| ????, 1958

|-
| 
|  | Russell W. Keeney (R)
| Died January 11, 1958.
| Vacant
| Not filled this term.

|-
| 
|  | August H. Andresen (R)
| Died January 14, 1958.
|   | Al Quie (R)
| February 18, 1958

|-
| 
|  | Lawrence H. Smith (R)
| Died January 22, 1958.
| colspan=2 | Not filled this term.

|-
| 
|  | John J. Dempsey (D)
| Died March 11, 1958.
| colspan=2 | Not filled this term.

|-
| 
|  | George S. Long (D)
| Died March 22, 1958.
| colspan=2 | Not filled this term.

|-
| 
|  | William E. McVey (R)
| Died August 10, 1958.
| colspan=2 | Not filled this term.

|-
| 
|  | Herman P. Eberharter (D)
| Died September 9, 1958.
| colspan=2 | Not filled this term.

|-
| 
|  | J. Harry McGregor (R)
| Died October 7, 1958.
| colspan=2 | Not filled this term.

|-
| 
|  | Sid Simpson (R)
| Died October 26, 1958.
| colspan=2 | Not filled this term.

|-
| 
|  | Richard B. Wigglesworth (R)
| Resigned November 13, 1958.
| colspan=2 | Not filled this term.

|-
| 
|  | Henry J. Latham (R)
| Resigned December 31, 1958, after becoming a judge of the New York Supreme Court.
| colspan=2 | Not filled this term.

|}

Committees

Senate
 Agriculture and Forestry (Chairman: Allen J. Ellender; Ranking Member: George D. Aiken)
 Appropriations (Chairman: Carl Hayden; Ranking Member: Styles Bridges)
 Armed Services (Chairman: Richard B. Russell; Ranking Member: Leverett Saltonstall)
 Banking and Currency (Chairman: J. William Fulbright; Ranking Member: Homer Capehart)
 District of Columbia (Chairman: Matthew M. Neely; Ranking Member: J. Glenn Beall)
 Finance (Chairman: Harry F. Byrd; Ranking Member: Edward Martin)
 Foreign Relations (Chairman: Theodore F. Green; Ranking Member: Alexander Wiley)
 Foreign Aid Program (Special)
 Government Operations (Chairman: John Little McClellan; Ranking Member: Joseph McCarthy then Karl E. Mundt)
 Interior and Insular Affairs (Chairman: James E. Murray; Ranking Member: George W. Malone)
 Interstate and Foreign Commerce (Chairman: Warren G. Magnuson; Ranking Member: John W. Bricker)
 Judiciary (Chairman: James O. Eastland; Ranking Member: Alexander Wiley)
 Labor and Public Welfare (Chairman: J. Lister Hill; Ranking Member: H. Alexander Smith)
 Labor-Management Relations (Select)
 Political Activities, Lobbying and Campaign Contributions (Special)
 Post Office and Civil Service (Chairman: Olin D. Johnston; Ranking Member: Frank Carlson)
 Preserve Historical Records of the Senate (Special)
 Public Works (Chairman: Dennis Chavez; Ranking Member: Edward Martin)
 Rules and Administration (Chairman: Thomas C. Hennings Jr.; Ranking Member: Carl T. Curtis)
 Senate Reception Room (Special)
 Small Business (Select) (Chairman: John J. Sparkman)
 Space and Aeronautics (Special)
 Subcommittee on Internal Security
 Whole

House of Representatives

 Agriculture (Chairman: Harold D. Cooley; Ranking Member: August H. Andresen then William S. Hill)
 Appropriations (Chairman: Clarence Cannon; Ranking Member: John Taber) 
 Armed Services (Chairman: Carl Vinson; Ranking Member: Leslie C. Arends) 
 Banking and Currency (Chairman: Brent Spence; Ranking Member: Henry O. Talle) 
 Benefits for Dependents of Armed Services Veterans (Select)
 Defense Production
 District of Columbia (Chairman: John L. McMillan; Ranking Member: Sid Simpson then Joseph P. O'Hara)
 Education and Labor (Chairman: Graham A. Barden; Ranking Member: Samuel K. McConnell then Ralph W. Gwinn)
 Foreign Affairs (Chairman: Thomas S. Gordon; Ranking Member: Robert B. Chiperfield)
 Government Operations (Chairman: William L. Dawson; Ranking Member: Clare E. Hoffman)
 House Administration (Chairman: Omar Burleson; Ranking Member: Karl M. LeCompte)
 Interior and Insular Affairs (Chairman: Clair Engle; Ranking Member: A.L. Miller)
 Interstate and Foreign Commerce (Chairman: Oren Harris; Ranking Member: Charles A. Wolverton)
 Judiciary (Chairman: Emanuel Celler; Ranking Member: Kenneth B. Keating)
 Merchant Marine and Fisheries (Chairman: Oren Harris; Ranking Member: Thor C. Tollefson)
 Post Office and Civil Service (Chairman: Tom J. Murray; Ranking Member: Edward H. Rees)
 Public Works (Chairman: Charles A. Buckley; Ranking Member: J. Harry McGregor then James C. Auchincloss)
 Rules (Chairman: Howard W. Smith; Ranking Member: Leo E. Allen) 
 Small Business (Select) (Chairman: Wright Patman)
 Un-American Activities (Chairman: Francis E. Walter; Ranking Member: Bernard W. Kearney)
 Veterans' Affairs (Chairman: Olin D. Johnston; Ranking Member: Edith Nourse Rogers)
 Ways and Means (Chairman: Jere Cooper; Ranking Member: Daniel A. Reed)
 Whole

Joint committees

 Atomic Energy (Chairman: Rep. Carl T. Durham; Vice Chairman: Sen. Clinton P. Anderson)
 Conditions of Indian Tribes (Special)
 Construction of a Building for a Museum of History and Technology for the Smithsonian
 Defense Production (Chairman: Sen. A. Willis Robertson; Vice Chairman: Rep. Paul Brown)
 Disposition of Executive Papers
 Economic (Chairman: Rep. Wright Patman; Vice Chairman: Sen. John J. Sparkman)
 Immigration and Nationality Policy (Chairman: Vacant; Vice Chairman: Vacant)
 Legislative Budget
 The Library (Chairman: Rep. Omar Burleson; Vice Chairman: Sen. Theodore F. Green)
 Navajo-Hopi Indian Administration
 Printing (Chairman: Sen. Carl Hayden; Vice Chairman: Rep. Omar Burleson)
 Reduction of Nonessential Federal Expenditures (Chairman: Sen. Harry F. Byrd; Vice Chairman: Rep. Clarence Cannon)
 Taxation (Chairman: Rep. Jere Cooper; Vice Chairman: Sen. Harry F. Byrd)
 Washington (DC) Metropolitan Problems

Employees

Legislative branch agency directors
 Architect of the Capitol: J. George Stewart
 Attending Physician of the United States Congress: George Calver
 Comptroller General of the United States: Joseph Campbell 
 Librarian of Congress: Lawrence Quincy Mumford 
 Public Printer of the United States: Raymond Blattenberger

Senate
 Chaplain: Frederick Brown Harris, Methodist
 Parliamentarian: Charles Watkins
 Secretary: Felton McLellan Johnston 
 Librarian: Richard D. Hupman
 Secretary for the Majority: Robert G. Baker
 Secretary for the Minority: J. Mark Trice
 Sergeant at Arms: Joseph C. Duke

House of Representatives
 Clerk: Ralph R. Roberts
 Doorkeeper: William Mosley "Fishbait" Miller
 Parliamentarian: Lewis Deschler
 Postmaster: H. H. Morris
 Reading Clerks: George J. Maurer (D) and Alney E. Chaffee (R) (until 1957) then Joe Bartlett (R) (starting 1957)
 Sergeant at Arms: Zeake W. Johnson Jr.
 Chaplain: Bernard Braskamp (Presbyterian)

See also
 1956 United States elections (elections leading to this Congress)
 1956 United States presidential election
 1956 United States Senate elections
 1956 United States House of Representatives elections
 1958 United States elections (elections during this Congress, leading to the next Congress)
 1958 United States Senate elections
 1958 United States House of Representatives elections

Notes

References